Tetratheca glandulosa is a spreading shrub in the family Elaeocarpaceae. It is endemic to New South Wales.

Description
Its leaves are alternate or opposite or rarely in whorls of three or four. They are linear and 3–20 mm long by 1–2 mm wide with revolute margins and stiff, occasionally gland-tipped hairs which give a toothed appearance. The midrib on lower surface is often glandular/hairy and the leaves are sometimes sessile.

The flowers are solitary (rarely paired) on peduncles which are 3–10 mm long. They can be hairy with dark red, gland-tipped and tubercle-based hairs. The sepals are 2–3 mm long and persist with the fruit. The deep lilac-pink petals are 4.5–10.5 mm long and also persist in the fruit. The ovary is hairy and there are two ovules. The fruit is 3–7 mm long and the seeds are greater than 3 mm long.

It usually flowers from July to November.

It grows in sandy or rocky heath or scrub, from Mangrove Mountain to the Blue Mountains and Sydney.

Taxonomy and naming
Tetratheca glandulosa was first described by James Edward Smith in 1804. The specific epithet, glandulosa, derives from the Latin noun glandula, meaning "gland", to give an adjective describing the plant as 
"bearing glands" or "gland-bearing".

Conservation status
In New South Wales, it has been declared "vulnerable".

References

glandulosa
Oxalidales of Australia
Flora of New South Wales
Plants described in 1804
Taxa named by James Edward Smith